Dupo is a village in St. Clair County, Illinois, United States. The population was 4,138 at the 2010 census, an increase from 3,933 in 2000. The village was settled in about 1750 and was incorporated in 1876. Its name is derived from Common Fields of Prairie du Pont.

Geography
Dupo is located at  (38.515702, -90.207992). It is located in the American Bottom floodplain of the Mississippi River.

History 
Dupo had its start ca. 1905 when the railroad was extended to that point. The name is an abbreviation of DuPont.

Demographics

In 2010 there were 4,138 people, 1,650 households, and 1,142 families residing in the village. The Population Density was 655 people per square mile(252.8/km). The racial makeup of the village was 94.9% White, 2.3% African American, 0.4% Native American, 0.3% Asian, 0.3% from other races, and 1.8% from two or more races. Hispanic or Latino of any race were 1.4% of the population.

There were 1,650 households, out of which 31.3% had children under the age of 18 living with them, 43.8% were married couples living together, 17.7% had a female householder with no husband present with 10.8% of all households having a female householder with kids. 7.7% had a male householder with no husband present with 4.2% of all households having a male householder with no wife and kids. 30.8% of all households were non-families. 25.3% of all households were made up of individuals, and 9.4% had someone living alone who was 65 years of age or older. The average household size was 2.51 and the average family size was 2.91.

In Dupo, 25.3% of the population was under 18, 6.8% from 20 to 24, 28.5% from 25 to 44, 26.2% from 45 to 64 and 10.7% who were 65 years of age or older. The median age was 35 years, For every 100 females, there were 97.2 males. 
The median income for a household in the village was $45,203, and the median income for a family was $58,370. Males had an average income of $45,621 versus $32,628 for females. The Per Capita Income for the village was $24,404. About 14.0% of families and 14.9% of the population were below the poverty line, including 25.2% of those under 18 and 14.4% of those age 65 and over.

As of the census of 2000, there were 3,933 people, 1,557 households, and 1,063 families residing in the village. The racial makeup of the village was 97.20% White, 1.17% African American, 0.31% Native American, 0.25% Asian, 0.36% from other races, and 0.71% from two or more races. Hispanic or Latino of any race were 0.69% of the population.

There were 1,557 households, out of which 32.6% had children under the age of 18 living with them, 52.9% were married couples living together, 11.0% had a female householder with no husband present, and 31.7% were non-families. 26.1% of all households were made up of individuals, and 10.9% had someone living alone who was 65 years of age or older. The average household size was 2.53 and the average family size was 3.04.

In the village, the population was spread out, with 25.2% under the age of 18, 10.7% from 18 to 24, 30.5% from 25 to 44, 21.4% from 45 to 64, and 12.1% who were 65 years of age or older. The median age was 35 years. For every 100 females, there were 96.0 males. For every 100 females age 18 and over, there were 92.9 males.

The median income for a household in the village was $43,036, and the median income for a family was $47,000. Males had a median income of $35,529 versus $24,135 for females. The per capita income for the village was $18,505. About 2.9% of families and 4.3% of the population were below the poverty line, including 5.2% of those under age 18 and 3.8% of those age 65 or over.

Education
Dupo is served by Dupo Community Unit School District and has one high school, Dupo High School.

Notable people
 Candace Jordan, television personality, Playboy Playmate December 1979

See also 

 American Bottom

References

Villages in St. Clair County, Illinois
Villages in Illinois
Populated places established in 1750
French colonial settlements of Upper Louisiana
1750 establishments in New France